"Hard Workin' Man" is a song written by Ronnie Dunn, and recorded by American country music duo Brooks & Dunn. It peaked at number four on the US Country charts in 1993 and was released in February 1993 as the first single and title track from their second album Hard Workin' Man. It also won the duo the Best Country Performance by a Duo or Group with Vocals in 1994.

In 2019, Brooks & Dunn re-recorded "Hard Workin' Man" with American country music duo Brothers Osborne for their album Reboot.

Cover versions
Country music singer Darius Rucker covered the song from The Last Rodeo Tour

Music video
The music video was directed by Sherman Halsey. It features the duo playing the song at Red Rock Canyon, and in front of a crowd while in two Cadillac convertibles on Fremont Street in Las Vegas. Footage of bull riders and professional horseback riders in competition are also seen, ending with a shot of a female horseback rider holding an American flag.

Chart positions
"Hard Workin' Man" debuted at number 57 on the Hot Country Singles & Tracks chart for the week of February 6, 1993.

Year-end charts

References

1993 singles
1993 songs
Brooks & Dunn songs
Brothers Osborne songs
Songs written by Ronnie Dunn
Song recordings produced by Scott Hendricks
Song recordings produced by Don Cook
Arista Nashville singles
Music videos directed by Sherman Halsey